.su is an Internet country code top-level domain (ccTLD) that was designated for the Soviet Union (USSR) on 19 September 1990. Even though the Soviet Union itself was dissolved a mere 15 months later, the .su top-level domain remains in use today with over 100,000 .su domains . It is administered by the Russian Institute for Public Networks (RIPN, or RosNIIROS in Russian transcription).

The .su TLD is known for usage by cybercriminals.

History 
After 1989 a set of new internet domains was created in Europe, including .pl (Poland), .cs (Czechoslovakia), .yu (Yugoslavia) and .dd (East Germany). Among them, there was also a domain for the USSR – .su. Initially, before two-letter ccTLDs became standard, the Soviet Union was to receive a .ussr domain. The .su domain was proposed by the 19-year-old Finnish student Petri Ojala. On 26 December 1991 the country was dissolved and its constituent republics gained independence, which should have caused the domain to begin a phase-out process, as happened with those of East Germany, Czechoslovakia, and Yugoslavia. Until 1994 there was no assigned top-level domain name for Russia. For this reason the country continued to use the Soviet domain. In 1994 the .ru domain was created, which is supposed to eventually replace the .su domain (domains for the republics other than Russia were created at different times in the mid-nineties). The domain was supposed to be withdrawn by ICANN, but it was kept at the request of the Russian government and Internet users.

In 2001, the managers of the domain stated that they would commence accepting new .su registrations, but it is unclear whether this action was compatible with ICANN policies. ICANN has expressed intentions to terminate the .su domain and IANA states that the domain is being phased out, but lobbyists stated in September 2007 that they had started negotiations with ICANN on retaining the domain. In the first quarter of 2008, .su registrations increased by 45%.

Usage 
The domain was intended to be used by Soviet institutions and companies operating in the USSR. The dissolution of the Soviet Union meant that the new TLD was superseded by the new country TLDs of the former Soviet republics. Despite this, .su is still in use. Most of the .su domains are registered in Russia and the United States. According to the RU-CENTER data from May 2010, there were over 93,500 registered domains with the .su TLD (there are over 2.8 million .ru domains). Among the entities still using this domain is the pro-Russian armed insurgency in Eastern Ukraine.  The Russian Putinist youth movement Nashi used the domain until its dissolution in 2019. Some organizations with roots in the former Soviet Union also still use this TLD. The pro-Russian separatist group Donetsk People's Republic have also registered their domain with the TLD. The .su domain also hosts white supremacist websites that have been deplatformed elsewhere, formerly including The Daily Stormer. 

The domain has been reported to host many cybercrime activities due to the relaxed and outdated terms of use, along with staying out of focus (2% usage comparing to the primary .ru zone). Rules for timely suspension of malicious domains have been in place since 2013 to (attempt to) address the issue.

See also 

 .рф
 .ru
 Runet
 Technical Center of Internet

References

External links 
 
 Statistics of registrations under the .su domain
 RIPN press release regarding future of .su domain 

Computing in the Soviet Union
Country code top-level domains
Internet in Russia
1990 establishments in the Soviet Union
Communications in the Soviet Union
Computer-related introductions in 1990

sv:Toppdomän#S